List of films produced in the United Kingdom by the British subsidiary of Paramount Pictures. Initially founded at Islington Studios in the early 1920s, it was later revived following the passage of the 1927 Films Act allowing the company to produce films that qualified for British nationality and were eligible for a quota. During the 1930s the company produced or distributed a mixture of quota quickies and higher budget films.

1920s

1930s

1940s

1950s

1960s

1970s

See also
 List of General Film Distributors films
 List of Two Cities Films
 List of British and Dominions films
 List of Gainsborough Pictures films
 List of Ealing Studios films
 List of British Lion films
 List of British National films
 List of Butcher's Film Service films
 List of Stoll Pictures films

Bibliography
 Chibnall, Steve. Quota Quickies: The Birth of the British 'B' Film. British Film Institute, 2007.
 Low, Rachael. Filmmaking in 1930s Britain. George Allen & Unwin, 1985.
 Wood, Linda. British Films, 1927-1939. British Film Institute, 1986.

Paramount Pictures films
Lists of films by studio
Paramount Global-related lists